Asociația Fotbal Club Venus 1914 București, commonly known as Venus București, or simply as Venus, is a Romanian amateur football club based in Bucharest, founded in 1914 and re-founded in 2014. The club is currently playing in the Liga IV - București.

Venus players are nicknamed Negrii (English: The Blacks) due to their all black shirts. Before being dissolved by the Communist authorities, Venus was the most successful football club in Romania, winning seven Liga I championships.

The club's colours are black and white, and the club crest is an eight-pointed white star.

History

The club was established in 1914 in the old neighborhood of Venus, Bucharest. The team played at the Venus stadium that opened in 1931. It had a capacity of 15,000 spectators and it became the first stadium in Romania to host a match under floodlights in 1935.

The club won 7 national titles which came in 1920, 1929, 1932, 1934, 1937, 1939 and finally in 1940. It never managed to win the Romanian Cup having been beaten by local rivals Rapid București in the final in 1940 as well as losing to the same opponents in the semi-finals in 1937, 1938, 1939, 1941 and 1942.

The club also took part in three editions of the Mitropa Cup:
1937 Mitropa Cup – Last 16: Venus București 4–6 Ujpest and Ujpest 4–1 Venus București
1939 Mitropa Cup – Quarterfinals: Venus București 1–0 Bologna and Bologna 5–0 Venus București
1940 Mitropa Cup – Quarterfinals: BSK Beograd 3–0 Venus București and Venus București 0–1 BSK Beograd

In 1948, due to communist regime norms that stated that all sport associations had to join a trade-union or a governmental institution, the team was forced to merge with "UCB" ("Uzinele Comunale București" – Administration of Sewerage Systems). In 1949 the league was dissolved and the team disbanded.

In 2014 the team was reestablished and competed in Liga IV, Bucharest, fourth tier of the Romanian football, finishing 7th in Seria II.

Stadium

The club plays its home matches on Stadionul Biruința in Bucharest due to demolition of the Venus Stadium in 1953.

Honours

Domestic

Leagues
Liga I:
Winners (7): 1919–20, 1928–29, 1931–32, 1933–34, 1936–37, 1938–39, 1939–40

Liga V – Bucharest
Winners (1): 2021–22

Cups
Cupa României:
Runners-up (1): 1939–40

Former managers
  Franz Platko 1936-37
  Béla Jánossy 1938-40

References

External links
Official website

Association football clubs established in 1914
Football clubs in Bucharest
Liga I clubs
Liga IV clubs
1913 establishments in Romania